Jarisha (also transliterated Jerisha) was a Palestinian Arab village located  from the ancient site of Tell Jarisha (Tel Gerisa), on the south bank of Al-Awja (Yarkon River). After the establishment of Tel Aviv, it was one of five Arab villages to fall within its municipal boundaries. Jarisha was ethnically cleansed in the lead up to the 1948 Arab-Israeli war.

History
Jarisha was located only  from Tel Gerisa, an archaeological site dating to the Early Bronze II period (2800-2600 BC). In the Middle Bronze period (2000-1500 BC) the site was a fortified Hyksos town. It was succeeded by a Philistine settlement around the 12th century BC.

Ottoman period
In the 1596 tax records under the Ottoman Empire, it was a village in the nahiya ("subdistrict") of the Bani Sa'b, part of Nablus Sanjak. It had a population of 22 Muslim households; an estimated 121 persons, who paid taxes on buffalo, goats and beehives; a total of 2,150 akçe.

In 1856 the village was named Darishah on Kiepert's map of Palestine published that year. An Ottoman village list from about 1870 showed that the village had a population of 76 in a total of 38 houses, though that population count included men, only. It was further noted that it was located 6000 meters NE of Jaffa. 

In 1882 the PEF's Survey of Western Palestine (SWP) described the village, transcribed as "Jerisheh", as being built of adobe bricks and flanked by an olive grove. It had a well and a mill. South-east of the village was the ruins of a Khan, a graveyard and some caves, also a masonry dam and a small bridge, "apparently Saracenic".

British Mandate era
In the 1922 census of Palestine conducted by the British Mandate authorities, Jerisheh had a population of 57, all Muslims increasing by the 1931 census to 183, still all Muslims, in a total of 43 houses.

Since May 1944, Jarisha was part of the municipality of Ramat Gan.

In the 1945 statistics it had a population of 190 Muslims, with 555 dunams of land. The villagers worked in the service industry, but some also grew fruits and vegetables; in 1944-45 a total of 302 dunums of village land was used for citrus and bananas, and 89 dunums were irrigated or used for orchards. 3 dunams were classified as built-up areas.

1948, and after
According to the Palestinian historian Walid Khalidi, the state of the village site in 1992 was as follows: "The site has been completely covered over by highways and suburban houses."

Gallery

See also
Depopulated Palestinian locations in Israel

References

Bibliography

 (pp. 192−196: "Les Trois−Ponts, Jorgilia")

External links
Welcome to Jarisha
Jarisha, Zochrot
Jarisha from the Khalil Sakakini Cultural Center
Survey of Western Palestine, Map 13: IAA, Wikimedia commons

District of Jaffa
Arab villages depopulated prior to the 1948 Arab–Israeli War